Baksei Chamkrong is a small Hindu temple located in the Angkor complex (Siem Reap, Cambodia). It is dedicated to Shiva and used to hold a golden image of him. The temple can be seen on the left side when entering Angkor Thom at the southern gate. It was dedicated to Yasovarman by his son, King Harshavarman I.  The temple was completed by Rajendravarman II (944–968).

Name
The name "Baksei Chamkrong" means "The Bird Who Shelters Under Its Wings" and comes from a legend. In it, the king tried to flee Angkor during a siege and then a huge bird landed and sheltered him under its wings.

Description
This temple is one of the first temples constructed of durable material such as bricks and laterite and with decoration in sandstone. A brick enclosure originally surrounded the pyramid with a stone gopura on the east side is now almost completely disappeared. Much of the stucco on the surface of the temple has vanished. The main sandstone lintel is decorated with a fine carving of Indra standing on his three-headed elephant Airavata. Garlands emanate from either side of Indra in the style current to the monument. There is an inscription on either side of the small doorway which detail the dedication and praises the early Khmer kings from Jayavarman II onward as well as earlier legendary kings, including the ancestor of the nation, the hermit Kambu.

The pyramid measures 27 metres across at the base and 15 at the summit for an overall height of 13 metres. Four stairway reach the summit at the cardinal points. The brick sanctuary tower, eight meters square on a sandstone base open to the east with the usual blind doors on the other sides.

Gallery

See also 

 Phnom Bakheng
 Prasat Bei
 Thma Bay Kaek

References 

Hindu temples in Siem Reap Province
Angkorian sites in Siem Reap Province